Tieri is a surname. Notable people with the surname include:

Aroldo Tieri (1917–2006), Italian actor
Frank Tieri (born 1970), American comic book writer
Frank Tieri (1904–1981), New York mobster